Shuangqiao Subdistrict is a subdistrict in Hanjiang District, Yangzhou, Jiangsu, China. , it administers the following eight residential communities: 
Shuangqiao Community
Wutang Community
Shiqiao Community
Buqiao Community
Wenyuan Community
Hongqiao Community
Kangle Community
Wenyang Community

See also 
 List of township-level divisions of Jiangsu

References 

Township-level divisions of Jiangsu
Hanjiang District, Yangzhou